
James Marvin Herndon (born 1944) is an American interdisciplinary scientist and serial conspiracy theorist who earned his BA degree in physics in 1970 from the University of California, San Diego and his Ph.D. degree in nuclear chemistry in 1974 from Texas A&M University. For three years, J. Marvin Herndon was a post-doctoral assistant to Hans Suess and Harold C. Urey in geochemistry and cosmochemistry at the University of California, San Diego. He has been profiled in Current Biography, and dubbed a “maverick geophysicist” by The Washington Post.

Theories on Earth 
Herndon suggested that the composition of the inner core of Earth is nickel silicide; the conventional view is that it is iron–nickel alloy.  In 1992, he suggested "georeactor" planetocentric nuclear fission reactors as energy sources for the gas giant outer planets, as the energy source and production mechanism for the geomagnetic field  and stellar ignition by nuclear fission.

In 2005, Herndon postulated what he calls whole-earth decompression dynamics, which he describes as a unified theory combining elements of plate tectonics and Earth expansion. He suggests that Earth formed from a Jupiter-sized gas giant by catastrophic loss of its gaseous atmosphere with subsequent decompression and expansion of the rocky remnant planet resulting in decompression cracks at divergent continental margins which are filled in by basalts from mid-ocean ridges.

Recent measurements of "geoneutrino" fluxes in the KamLAND and Borexino experiments have placed stringent upper limits on Herndon's "georeactor" hypothesis on the presence of an active nuclear fission reactor in the Earth's inner core, so that such reactor would produce less than 3 TW.

Chemtrail theory proponent 

Herndon has become a proponent of the chemtrail conspiracy theory and published several peer-reviewed papers claiming that coal fly ash is being sprayed for geoengineering. In 2016, two of his papers, however, were retracted because of flaws; Herndon disputed the reason for retraction, claiming the retractions were "a well-organized effort (CIA?) to deceive... Those concerted efforts to cause said retractions prove that the high officials who ordered the spraying know very well that they are poisoning humanity and want to hide that fact".

References

Further reading
Keay Davidson, "Scientific maverick's theory on Earth's core up for a test - Controversial view sees vast uranium field that serves as natural reactor", San Francisco Chronicle, November 29, 2004. 
Tom Siegfried, "Natural nuke may explain - Earth's magnetic flips", The Dallas Morning News, October 1, 2001. Article in NewsBank.
"Picture of a doomed Earth makes it to Hollywood", USA Today, March 4, 2003. Article in EBSCO Newspaper Source Plus, Item: J0E055704256303
Jay Ingram, "At its Core, it was a silly publicity stunt", Toronto Star, April 6, 2003. Article in EBSCO Newspaper Source Plus, Item: 6FP2356036695
Brad Lemley, "Nuclear Planet" (cover story), Discover, Aug2002, Vol. 23 Issue 8, p36. 7p. 2 Color Photographs, 1 Diagram. 
Susan Kruglinski, "Journey to the Center of the Earth", Discover, Jun2007, Vol. 28 Issue 6, p54-56. 3p., 
Tim Appenzeller, "Dead Center", U.S. News & World Report, 3/17/2003, Vol. 134 Issue 8, p50. 1/3p. 1 Color Photograph. Article in EBSCO MasterFILE Complete.
Dorion Sagan, Cosmic Apprentice: Dispatches from the Edges of Science, Ch. 11 "Priests of the Modern Age", University of Minnesota Press, 2013. 

Mick West, "Debunked: J. Marvin Herndon's "Geoengineering" Articles in Current Science (India) and IJERPH", MetaBunk, June 22, 2015. 
W. Seifritz, "Some comments on Herndon's nuclear georeactor". Kerntechnik , 2003, 68(4), 193–196.
 “The Fourth Source. Effects of Natural Nuclear Reactors” by Robert J. Tuttle

External links 
 NuclearPlanet.com, a website operated by J. Marvin Herndon

American nuclear physicists
American astrophysicists
American geophysicists
American conspiracy theorists
Living people
1944 births
University of California, San Diego alumni
Texas A&M University alumni
Place of birth missing (living people)